Jan Finney (born April 18, 1980) is an American female mixed martial artist. She currently competes in the 135-pound bantamweight division.

Early life
Finney played softball at Kenton Ridge High School and Urbana University.

Mixed martial arts career
Finney made her professional MMA debut on November 6, 2004, at HOOKnSHOOT: Evolution and defeated Rikki Burnett by Unanimous Decision.

She entered the 2005 HOOKnSHOOT Women's Grand Prix on November 19, 2005, but was defeated by Julie Kedzie in the second round of the tournament. She faced Kedzie again in a rematch on October 7, 2006, at KOTC: Meltdown, but was once again defeated by Unanimous Decision.

Finney faced Keiko Tamai at BodogFight – Costa Rica on February 16, 2007. She lost the fight via armbar submission in the second round.

Finney was scheduled to face Gina Carano at Elite XC/K-1 HERO's Dynamite !! USA on June 2, 2007, but the fight was cancelled after Carano was forced to withdraw due to illness.

Finney made her ShoXC debut on July 27, 2007, against Shayna Baszler. She was defeated by armbar submission in the first round.

She faced Kedzie for a third time on September 29, 2007, in HOOKnSHOOT, but lost the fight by technical knockout in the second round.

Finney is managed by Wade Hampel of Big Fight Management.

Finney entered the one-night 2007 HOOKnSHOOT Women's Grand Prix on November 24, 2007. She faced Miesha Tate in the opening round. After three rounds, the fight was ruled a Draw and went to an overtime round. Following the overtime round, the fight was again ruled a Draw and the referee awarded the victory to Tate.

Finney moved up in weight to face Erin Toughill at PFC 11: All In on November 20, 2008. Finney was defeated by Unanimous Decision.

Finney entered the Freestyle Cage Fighting Women's Bantamweight Grand Prix at FCF 39 on January 30, 2010. She defeated Lizbeth Carreiro by Unanimous Decision.

On March 27, 2010, Finney defeated Adrienna Jenkins by Unanimous Decision at FCF 40 to advance to the finals of the FCF tournament. However, FCF later agreed to release Finney from her contract in order for Finney to sign with Strikeforce and she was replaced in the FCF tournament final by Jenkins.

Finney made her Strikeforce debut on June 26, 2010, at Strikeforce: Fedor vs. Werdum. She faced current Women's Middleweight Champion (145 lbs) Cristiane "Cyborg" Santos and lost the fight via KO in the second round.

Finney then faced Liz Carmouche at Strikeforce Challengers: Wilcox vs. Ribeiro on November 19, 2010. She lost the fight via TKO in the third round.

Finney faced world champion boxer Holly Holm in a mixed martial arts bout at Fresquez Productions: Clash in the Cage on September 9, 2011. She was defeated by TKO in the third round.

Finney was scheduled to face Kaitlin Young in the main event of Freestyle Cage Fighting 49 on October 1, but withdrew from the fight and was replaced by Liz Carreiro.

Mixed martial arts record

|-
|Loss
|align=center|11–14
|Vanessa Melo
|Decision (unanimous)
|Battlefield FC 2
|
|align=center|3
|align=center|5:00
|Macau, SAR, China
|
|-
| Loss
| align=center| 11–13
| Pam Sorenson
| Decision (split) 
| IT Fight Series 77
| 
| align=center| 3
| align=center| 5:00
| Bellefontaine, Ohio, United States
|
|-
| Win
| align=center | 11–12
| Janice Meyer
| TKO (punches)
| IT Fight Series 48
| 
| align=center | 2
| align=center | 2:06
| Columbus, Ohio, United States
|
|-
| Win
| align=center | 10–12
| Al-Lanna Jones
| TKO (punches)
| STFC 40
| 
| align=center | 2
| align=center | 1:07
| McAllen, Texas, United States
|
|-
| Win
| align=center | 9–12
| Al-Lanna Jones
| Decision (unanimous)
| IT Fight Series 38
| 
| align=center | 3
| align=center | 5:00
| Dayton, Ohio, United States
|
|-
| Loss
| align=center | 8–12
| Marciea Allen
| Decision (unanimous)
| IT Fight Series 35
| 
| align=center | 3
| align=center | 5:00
| Springfield, Ohio, United States
|
|-
| Loss
| align=center | 8–11
| Valentina Shevchenko
| Decision (unanimous)
| Legacy FC 39
| 
| align=center | 3
| align=center | 5:00
| Houston, Texas, United States
|
|-
| Loss
| align=center | 8–10
| Holly Holm
| TKO (body kick)
| Fresquez Productions: Clash in the Cage
| 
| align=center | 3
| align=center | 2:49
| Albuquerque, New Mexico, United States
|
|-
| Loss
| align=center | 8–9
| Liz Carmouche
| TKO (punches)
| Strikeforce Challengers: Wilcox vs. Ribeiro
| 
| align=center | 3
| align=center | 1:30
| Jackson, Mississippi, United States
|
|-
| Loss
| align=center | 8–8
| Cris Cyborg
| TKO (knee to the body)
| Strikeforce: Fedor vs. Werdum
| 
| align=center | 2
| align=center | 2:56
| San Jose, California, United States
| 
|-
| Win
| align=center | 8–7
| Adrienna Jenkins
| Decision (split)
| Freestyle Cage Fighting 40
| 
| align=center | 3
| align=center | 5:00
| Shawnee, Oklahoma, United States
|
|-
| Win
| align=center | 7–7
| Lizbeth Carreiro
| Decision (unanimous)
| Freestyle Cage Fighting 39
| 
| align=center | 3
| align=center | 5:00
| Shawnee, Oklahoma, United States
|
|-
| Win
| align=center | 6–7
| Brighton Hutton
| KO (punches)
| C3: Slammin Jammin Weekend 2
| 
| align=center | 2
| align=center | 1:31
| Red Rock, Oklahoma, United States
|
|-
| Win
| align=center | 5–7
| Marissa Caldwell
| TKO (punches)
| MMA Big Show: Full Force
| 
| align=center | 1
| align=center | N/A
| Florence, Indiana, United States
|
|-
| Loss
| align=center | 4–7
| Erin Toughill
| Decision (unanimous)
| PPFC 11: All In
| 
| align=center | 3
| align=center | 3:00
| Lemoore, California, United States
|
|-
| Win
| align=center | 4–6
| Suzy Smith
| KO (punch)
| Brawl at the Beach
| 
| align=center | 2
| align=center | 1:33
| Jacksonville, North Carolina, United States
|
|-
| Loss
| align=center | 3–6
| Miesha Tate
| Decision (referee decision)
| HOOKnSHOOT: BodogFight Women's Tournament
| 
| align=center | 4
| align=center | 3:00
| Evansville, Indiana, United States
|
|-
| Loss
| align=center | 3–5
| Julie Kedzie
| TKO (punches)
| HOOKnSHOOT: MW Tournament
| 
| align=center | 2
| align=center | 2:44
| Evansville, Indiana, United States
|
|-
| Loss
| align=center | 3–4
| Shayna Baszler
| Submission (armbar)
| ShoXC: Elite Challenger Series
| 
| align=center | 1
| align=center | 2:40
| Santa Ynez, California, United States
|
|-
| Loss
| align=center | 3–3
| Keiko Tamai
| Submission (armbar)
| BodogFight: Costa Rica Combat
| 
| align=center | 2
| align=center | 3:01
| Costa Rica
|
|-
| Win
| align=center | 3–2
| Ginele Marquez
| Submission (armbar)
| HOOKnSHOOT: The Women Return
| 
| align=center | 1
| align=center | 3:38
| Evansville, Indiana, United States
|
|-
| Loss
| align=center | 2–2
| Julie Kedzie
| Decision (unanimous)
| KOTC: Meltdown
| 
| align=center | 2
| align=center | 5:00
| Indianapolis, Indiana, United States
|
|-
| Loss
| align=center | 2–1
| Julie Kedzie
| Decision (unanimous)
| HOOKnSHOOT: 2005 Women's Grand Prix
| 
| align=center | 3
| align=center | 5:00
| Evansville, Indiana, United States
|
|-
| Win
| align=center | 2–0
| Mystee Blackwood
| KO (punch)
| HOOKnSHOOT: 2005 Women's Grand Prix
| 
| align=center | 1
| align=center | 0:38
| Evansville, Indiana, United States
|
|-
| Win
| align=center | 1–0
| Rikki Burnett
| Decision (unanimous)
| HOOKnSHOOT: Evolution
| 
| align=center | 2
| align=center | 5:00
| Evansville, Indiana, United States
|

See also
 List of female mixed martial artists

References

External links
 Jan Finney Awakening Profile
 
 Fightergirls.com profile

1980 births
Living people
Sportspeople from Springfield, Ohio
Urbana University alumni
Mixed martial artists from Ohio
American female mixed martial artists
Featherweight mixed martial artists
21st-century American women